Although Libya has more reserves, there were  of proven oil reserves in Nigeria as of 2011, ranking the country as the largest oil producer in Africa and the 11th largest in the world, averaging  in 2006. At current rates this would be 45 years of supply if no new oil was found. Nigeria is the world's eighth largest exporter of crude oil and no longer sends 43% of its exports to the United States due to the recent shale boom of the US. Nigeria's foreign exchange is heavily dependent on the oil sector, which accounts for a majority of its export revenues.

Prospective resources
Nigeria and São Tomé have an agreement in which the Joint Development Authority was created to explore and produce oil in the waters between Sao Tome and Nigeria. Nigeria and Sao Tome share this area, called the Joint Development Zone, or JDZ. This area could contain up to, or over, 14 billion barrels of oil. In 2006, Chevron drilled an exploratory well called OBO-1 and news reports came out that they had discovered over a thousand million barrels of oil in block 1 alone. The news was reported on CNN and AP.

References

External links

"Nigeria facts and figures". OPEC. Retrieved March 29, 2017.

Petroleum in Nigeria
Nigeria
Geology of Nigeria